Ruyton-XI-Towns is a civil parish in Shropshire, England.  It contains 38 listed buildings that are recorded in the National Heritage List for England.  Of these, three are listed at Grade II*, the middle of the three grades, and the others are at Grade II, the lowest grade.  The parish contains the large village of Ruyton-XI-Towns and smaller settlements including Wykey, and is otherwise rural.  The parish contains two country houses and other large houses that are listed, together with associated structures.  Most of the other listed buildings are smaller houses, cottages, farmhouses and farm buildings, the earliest of which are timber framed or have timber-framed cores.  The remainder include two churches, items in a churchyard, the remains of a castle, public houses, a cross, and a war memorial.


Key

Buildings

References

Citations

Sources

Lists of buildings and structures in Shropshire